Richard Jerome Thorpe (August 29, 1926 – September 25, 2018) was an American television-and-film director and producer. Actor and director Richard Thorpe was his father.

Thorpe served as the executive producer of 33 episodes of The Untouchables (starring Robert Stack) during the series' 2nd season (1960–61). Thorpe also served as executive producer of Harry O, the 1973-75 David Janssen TV series. 

Thorpe won an Emmy award for his work on an episode of Kung Fu. In 2003, a Golden Palm Star on the Palm Springs, California, Walk of Stars was dedicated to him and his father.

Thorpe died in Santa Barbara, California, at the age of 92 from natural causes. He was buried at Desert Memorial Park in Cathedral City, California.

Filmography
 The Venetian Affair (1966), starring Robert Vaughn
 Day of the Evil Gun (1968), starring Glenn Ford
 Lock, Stock, and Barrel (1971), a television movie
 A Question of Love (1978), a television movie

References

External links
 

1926 births
2018 deaths
American television directors
American television producers
American television writers
American male television writers
Burials at Desert Memorial Park
Film directors from Los Angeles
Television producers from California